Zhou Ruiyang (born March 8, 1991) is a Chinese professional Go player.

Biography
Zhou began playing Go at the age of 7. He won the biggest amateur tournament in China, the Wanbao Cup, both the same year before he became a professional. In 2005, he was promoted to 3p. Earlier that year, he won the U-15 section of the oldest international competition, the Fujitsu Cup. Zhou made history in 2006, beating Kong Jie in the challenger final for the Tianyuan, the second biggest title in China (after Mingren). At the age of 15 years, he became the youngest challenger for the title. The final of the Tianyuan was a best-of-3 against title holder Gu Li. Zhou won the first game, but lost the remaining two. Recently, he has been promoted to 5 dan. Zhou became the youngest titleholder in China in 2007 at 16 years and 0 days old. In 2010, Zhou reached the final of the Chang-ki Cup, and against his opponent Tuo Jiaxi, his record stands at five-wins six losses. They are currently in the deciding game in the 3-game match, and the winner receives 400,000 Yuan.

Promotion record

Titles and runners-up

Head-to-head record vs selected players
 
Players who have won international Go titles in bold.

 Tuo Jiaxi 20:14
 Gu Li 24:9
 Niu Yutian 18:6
 Kong Jie 11:12
 Chen Yaoye 16:4
 Li Zhe 10:8
 Qiu Jun 6:11
 Lian Xiao 7:9
 Mi Yuting 6:10
 Shi Yue 8:7
  Xie He 8:7
 Park Junghwan 4:11
  Chang Hao 10:4
 Piao Wenyao 8:6
 Tan Xiao 7:7
 Hu Yaoyu 7:6
 Peng Liyao 7:6
 Liu Xing 6:7
 Peng Quan 9:3
 Wang Haoyang 9:3
 Wu Guangya 9:3
  Wang Xi 5:7
 Gu Lingyi 11:0
 Choi Cheolhan 3:8

References

External links
GoGameWorld profile

Living people
1991 births
Chinese Go players
Asian Games medalists in go
Go players at the 2010 Asian Games
Sportspeople from Xi'an
Asian Games silver medalists for China
Medalists at the 2010 Asian Games